This article refers to one of the former prefectures of Chad. From 2002 the country was divided into 18 regions.

Salamat was one of the 14 prefectures of Chad. Located in the southeast of the country, Salamat covered an area of 63,000 square kilometers and had a population of 184,403 in 1993. Its capital was Am Timan.

Salamat's population was a mix of both Muslim and non-Muslim peoples.

In the late 1960s, a highly regarded wildlife reserve was destroyed by Chadian rebels, although many native wildlife specimens survived, including elephants and giraffes. The area included some of the only water sources that remained available through the ten-month dry season.

See also
2006 Zakouma elephant slaughter

References

Prefectures of Chad

fr:Salamat